Behbahan (also romanized as Behbahān and Behbehān) is a city and capital of Behbahan County, Khuzestan Province, Iran.

Etymology 
The origin of the name "Behbahan" may be from two words: "Beh" meaning good better, and "Bahan" meaning "tent." Settlers in the land may had priorly been tent dwellers, and upon building homes in area referred to them as better than tents.

Historical monuments
The historical tomb of the Jew Bashir and Nazir in the city of Behbahan is a symbol of this city and is considered one of the oldest historical monuments in the province of Khuzestan.

Climate
Behbahan has a hot semi-arid climate (Köppen: BSh), characterised by sweltering and rainless summers and pleasant winters with occasional heavy rainfall.

See also

Arjan bowl
Mohammad-Ali Behbahani

References

External links
 The Marafi (Behbahani) Family of Kuwait
 Behbahani dialect profile

Populated places in Behbahan County
Cities in Khuzestan Province